Archiborborus is a genus of flies belonging to the family lesser dung flies.

Species
A. albicans Richards, 1931
A. alternatus (Rondani, 1868) 
A. annulatus Richards, 1963
A. argentinensis Papp, 1977
A. calceatus Duda, 1921
A. chaetosus Richards, 1961
A. chilensis Richards, 1931
A. edwardsi Richards, 1931
A. femoralis (Blanchard, 1852)
A. hirtus (Bigot, 1888)
A. hirtipes (Macquart, 1843)
A. koenigi Duda, 1932
A. maculipennis Duda, 1921
A. maximus Richards, 1961
A. mexicanus Steyskal, 1973
A. microphthalma Richards, 1931
A. nitidicollis (Becker, 1919)
A. orbitalis Duda, 1921
A. quadrinotus (Bigot, 1888)
A. setosus Duda, 1921
A. simplicimanus Richards, 1931
A. submaculatus Duda, 1921

References

Sphaeroceridae
Diptera of South America
Schizophora genera
Taxa named by Oswald Duda